Malta made their Eurovision Young Musicians debut at the Eurovision Young Musicians 2014.

History
Maltese broadcasting network, Public Broadcasting Services, were responsible for selecting their representative at the contest.  Applications were submitted on 31 January 2014 to the broadcasters offices in Gwardamanġa  Kurt Aquilina won the national selection show which took place in Spring 2014.

Participation overview

See also
Malta in the Eurovision Song Contest
Malta in the Junior Eurovision Song Contest

References

External links
 Eurovision Young Musicians

Countries in the Eurovision Young Musicians